HMS Wellington was a 74-gun third rate ship of the line of the Royal Navy, launched on 21 September 1816 at Deptford Dockyard.

The ship had originally been named HMS Hero, but was renamed Wellington on 4 December 1816. She became a training ship in 1862, and Wellington was eventually sold out of the Navy in 1908.

In 1826, HMS Wellington introduced mosquitos to the Hawaiian islands. These mosquitoes were introduced to a stream on Maui when sailors seeking fresh water rinsed out their water barrels in the stream. Prior to this, no mosquitoes lived in Hawaii.

Fate
Wellington was converted to a  training ship and named Akbar on 10 May 1862. In January 1877, she was driven ashore at Rock Ferry, Cheshire. She was refloated on 4 January. Akbar served in as a training ship until 1908. She arrived at Thos. W. Ward, Morecambe on 8 April 1908 for breaking up.

Notes

References

External links
 

Ships of the line of the Royal Navy
Vengeur-class ships of the line
Ships built in Deptford
1816 ships
Maritime incidents in January 1877